JamFactory is a not-for-profit arts organisation which includes training facilities, galleries and shops, located in the West End precinct of Adelaide and on the Seppeltsfield Estate in the Barossa Valley, north of Adelaide. It is supported by the South Australian Government and private donors.

History
JamFactory was established as a craft training workshop in 1973 by the Dunstan government, housed in an old jam factory on Payneham Road, in the suburb of St Peters. In 1992 it moved to a purpose-built building in the West End creative precinct of Adelaide city, on Morphett Street in close proximity to the Lion Arts Centre and Mercury Cinema.

The ceramics studio opened in 1979, with  Jeff Mincham as creative director (1979-1982), followed by Bronwyn Kemp (1983-1988), Peter Anderson (1989-1990), Stephen Bowers (1990-1999), Neville Assad-Salha (1999-2003), Philip Hart (2006-2008), Robin Best (2008-2010) and Damon Moon (2014-2018).

As part of a major interior refurbishment in 2014, the Adelaide Casino commissioned hand-crafted glass light pendants from a team of 12 artists at the JamFactory, which would be hung from the ceiling of the  plus SKYroom.

In July 2017 it received public funding of  towards a new retail store and increased production capacity at its West End studios, after having increased its turnover by 55% in the previous five years at both locations. They had increased their staff and also been hiring out the studios to independent artists. The planned purchase of a new  furnace for the glass studio, would increase its capacity by a third. It was also planning to open a new retail store in the North Terrace cultural precinct.

Between 1993 and 2018, JamFactory's funding was managed by Arts South Australia, but under the new Marshall government, its governance was moved in 2018 to the Department of Innovation and Skills.

Designers Daniel To and Emma Aiston, who had previously run an arts studio known as "Daniel Emma" together since 2008, took over as creative directors of JamFactory at the beginning of 2019. At the same time, a collaboration between JamFactory and the National Gallery of Victoria’s Melbourne NGV Design store was begun, to retail the "Good Morning" collection of designer homewares.

Description
The city location is at 19 Morphett Street, next door to the Mercury Cinema and Lion Arts Centre. Four studios provide programs in ceramics, jewellery-making and fine metalwork, glass-making and furniture-making. JamFactory also collaborates with other organisations, architects and designers on specially commissioned work and projects. It commissions work, functions as a publisher and runs workshops.

The Seppeltsfield studio and shop opened in 2013 as a regional extension, to support local craftspeople and as an tourism offering. It is housed in an historic 1850s stables building, which has been extensively renovated.

Directors To and Aiston describe JamFactory as "an institution is not only iconic but is a unique place where skilled traditional craftspeople mix their expertise within a curated and design focussed environment which can’t be compared to anything else in the country”.

Training
The JamFactory’s Associate Training Program is a two-year course in ceramics, glass, furniture or metal. The course teaches the relevant technical skills necessary for their craft as well as the essential business skills required to run a creative practice. Many alumni, such as Clare Belfrage, creative director of the Canberra Glassworks from 2009 and 2013, have become internationally-known and influential designer-makers.

Selected exhibitions and events
From March to March 2011, in collaboration with the Institute for Photonics & Advanced Sensing (IPAS) at the University of Adelaide, the A Fine Line - Glass Meets Art Exhibition displayed the technique and process behind the making of glass art as well as the glass that underpins new technologies.
From April to June 2013, the JamFactory hosted an exhibition featuring the work of its alumni, entitled Designing Craft/Crafting Design: 40 Years of JamFactory.
On 26 April 2015 a special event celebrating food, wine and design showcased the products of 12 Glynde food and wine businesses, in collaboration with the City of Norwood Payneham & St Peters council,.
From October to December 2018, in collaboration with the University of South Australia, JamFactory put on the exhibition Adelaide Modern, a three-part exploration of furniture design which included exhibits by design students.

References

1973 establishments in Australia
Crafts educators
Jewellery retailers of Australia
Barossa Valley